Gray Township may refer to:

Gray Township, Lonoke County, Arkansas, in Lonoke County, Arkansas
Gray Township, White County, Illinois
Gray Township, Pipestone County, Minnesota
Gray Township, Stutsman County, North Dakota, in Stutsman County, North Dakota
Gray Township, Greene County, Pennsylvania

Township name disambiguation pages